Dyschirius flavicornis is a species of ground beetle in the subfamily Scaritinae. It was described by Peringuey in 1896.

References

flavicornis
Beetles described in 1896